Ankabut ( ʿAnkabūt, literally, "spider") is the United Arab Emirates’ Advanced National Research and Education Network (NREN) offering academic institutions connectivity to other education networks around the world.  In addition to connecting universities, Ankabut can connect schools and public institutions together across the UAE with an effective cost model.  Ankabut will also co-operate on a national, GCC, regional and international arena representing the UAE in conferences, exhibitions, and fora.  Ankabut aims to offer QoS based networks with IPv4/IPv6, multicast and to introduce advanced services on a “Closed Group Network” for “Public Interest Purposes”.  Ankabut is currently owned by KUSTAR and operates with a Chief Executive Officer and a professional staff.

Ankabut interconnects universities with a 10G backbone and 1G access links. Ankabut also provides international connectivity of 155 Mbit/s to its members via Internet2. It enables a closed community network that allows the transfer of real-time services such as converged IM, voice and video communication, time-critical services such as grid computing interconnect (cloud computing), non-real time services such as e-learning, email, library interconnect, off-site disaster recovery, global federated single-sign-on, and Wi-Fi networking to name a few.

Ankabut supports initiatives in the e-learning environment, library content, distribution systems, and research collaboration.  Ankabut believes that identifying these initiatives and offering network, processing and storage support is the best way to develop a collective collaborative approach to research and education.

History 

In August 2006 Khalifa University, the Institute of Applied Technology, United Arab Emirates University, Zayed University and Higher Colleges of Technology signed a MOU which expressed interest in an initiative to create a Research and Education network was taken.

A study was undertaken to determine the feasibility of establishing such a network, the costs involved and the funding options. The study was based on leading NRENs around the world esp. in North America, Europe and the UK.

This study was presented to the forum consisting of IAT, UAE University, Zayed University, HCT and Khalifa and a consensus reached regarding the design and architecture of the network. It was agreed that the proposed network be named Ankabut.

The task of supervising the use and operation of the network was to be entrusted to a Consortium made up of members’ organizations using the network. An MOU to this effect was signed by all the participating Universities. It was agreed that Khalifa take the role of conveyor until the consortium is formed and the by-laws are formulated.

In June 2009 the ICT Fund awarded a 5-year grant to fund the Ankabut Project with management and additional funding by Khalifa University.

Education in the United Arab Emirates